And in the Darkness, Hearts Aglow is the fifth studio album by American musician Weyes Blood. It was released on November 18, 2022, by Sub Pop. The album is the second in a trilogy of recordings that began with the singer's previous album Titanic Rising (2019), describing the sequel as a personal response "to being in the thick of it."

And in the Darkness, Hearts Aglow received critical acclaim and was supported by three singles: "It's Not Just Me, It's Everybody", "Grapevine", and "God Turn Me Into a Flower". To promote the album, Weyes Blood will embark on the concert tour In Holy Flux Tour in 2023.

Background and release
On September 12, 2022, Natalie Mering officially announced her fifth studio album And in the Darkness, Hearts Aglow set for release on November 18, 2022, and released its lead single "It's Not Just Me, It's Everybody" the same day. In promotion of the album, she will embark on the In Holy Flux Tour across North America and Europe in 2023. The second single, "Grapevine", followed on October 11, 2022. The song, which takes its title from a stretch of California highway known as "the Grapevine", is inspired by Mering's breakup with a "narcissistic" musician during the COVID-19 pandemic. The third single, "God Turn Me Into a Flower", was released on November 16, 2022.

The album is the second entry into a trilogy of albums following 2019's Titanic Rising. According to Mering, Titanic Rising is an "observation, sounding the alarms that shit is going to go down" while And in the Darkness, Hearts Aglow is "my personal response to being in the thick of it". Mering's original concept for the artwork was to give the light inside her chest a "more alien" look.

Critical reception

And in the Darkness, Hearts Aglow received widespread acclaim from contemporary music critics. At Metacritic, which assigns a normalized rating out of 100 to reviews from mainstream critics, the album has an average score of 87 based on 25 reviews, indicating "universal acclaim". The editors of AnyDecentMusic? rated this release an 8.0 out of 10, based on 24 reviews. The Wall Street Journal Mark Richardson compared the album to Titanic Rising, Mering's previous album, saying it "easily matches its acclaimed predecessor in quality and scope." A five star review for NME praised the album direction and themes, saying "Mering's own vision of the end of the world is intricately woven and rich with melody" while also recognizing that "Mering's apparent take on heartbreak seems to be quietly optimistic". Alexis Petridis of The Guardian commended the album's complexity and musical experimentation, noting its musical inspirations such as Brian Wilson-esque arrangements and Karen Carpenter's vocal intonations. Similarly, a four star review by Helen Brown in The Independent noted a "a good range of textures across the 10 tracks" on the album.

Year-end lists

Track listing

Personnel
Credits adapted from the liner notes of And in the Darkness, Hearts Aglow.

Musicians
 Natalie Mering – piano (1, 10), vocals (1–5, 7–10), synthesiser (2, 4, 9, 10), guitar (3, 9), organ (4, 7), musician (8)
 Kenny Gilmore – bass (1–3)
 Logan Hone – flute, clarinet, soprano saxophone, alto saxophone (1)
 Mary Lattimore – harp (1–3, 5)
 Joey Waronker – drums (1, 9)
 Ben Babbitt – wind arrangement (1), vocal arrangement (2, 5, 9), backing vocals (2–5, 9), cello arrangement (4)
 Drew Erickson – string arragement (1–3, 5, 6), horn arrangement (2), organ (2, 3, 5)
 Michael D'Addario – drums (2, 3, 5)
 Brian D'Addario – guitar (2, 3), Wurlitzer (5)
 Andy Martin – vocals, piano, trombone (2, 3)
 Jonathan Rado – synthesiser (2, 3, 9), electronics (2), bass, tubular bells (3, 5), drum machine, guitar (7), musician (8)
 Michael Chadwick – synthesiser (3), harpsichord (5)
 Andres Renteria – shaker (3, 5)
 Cornella Babbitt – cello (4)
 Charlie Bisharat – electric violin (4)
 Daniel Lopatin – synthesiser (4)
 Meg Duffy – guitar (5)
 Sean Cook – cowbell (9)
 Sebastian Steinberg – bass (9)
 The Nona Strings Quartet (1–3, 5, 6):
 Jacob Braun – cello
 Andrew Bulbrook – 1st violin
 Zach Dellinger – viola
 Wynton Grant – 2nd violin
 Blake Cooper – tuba (2, 3)
 Dan Fornero – trumpet (2, 3)

Technical
 Natalie Mering – production
 Jonathan Rado – production
 Ben Babbitt – additional production (1, 4, 5, 9), additional vocal production (2)
 Emily Lazar – mastering
 Chris Allgood – mastering
 Kenny Gilmore – mixing
 Andrew Sarlo – engineering (1–6, 8)
 Sean Cook – additiional engineering (1–3, 5), engineering (4, 7, 9)
 Chad Gordon – additional engineering (1–6, 8), string engineering (1–3, 5, 6)
 Rias Reed – additional engineering (1–6, 8), string engineering (1–3, 5, 6)
 Jacob Kell – string engineering assistance (1–3, 5, 6)
 Sarah Tudzin – additional engineering (4, 9)
 Peter Labberton – engineering (10)

Artwork
 Elijah Funk – design, cover art concept
 Dusty Summers – design
 Neil Krug – photography, cover art concept
 Natalie Mering – cover art concept

Charts

Release history

References

Weyes Blood albums
2022 albums
Sub Pop albums
Sequel albums
Albums produced by Ben Babbitt
Albums produced by Weyes Blood
Albums produced by Jonathan Rado
Albums produced by Rodaidh McDonald